The goldie barb (Enteromius pallidus) is a species of ray-finned fish in the genus Enteromius. It is endemic to the Eastern Cape in South Africa where it is threatened by the introduction of non-native fish species.

Footnotes

References

goldie barb
Eastern Cape
Freshwater fish of South Africa
Endemic fish of South Africa
goldie barb
goldie barb